The Olympia Reign was a semi-professional basketball team competing in the International Basketball League (IBL). The club ceased operations after playing two of a scheduled six-game schedule in 2014.

History 
Based in Tumwater, Washington, they were founded in 2008 and played home games in the Nisqually Tribe Youth Recreation Center. They were sponsored by the Little Creek Casino Resort, the Kamilche Trading Post, Farmers Insurance Group, Oympia Physical Therapy, Northwest Sports Medicine Center, and the Brick on Trosper.

After three full seasons in the IBL the Reign and Little Creek Casino Resort parted ways. The club played just two games in 2013 and again in 2014 as a "branding team" in the league, not eligible for IBL playoffs.

Season-by-season

References

External links 
Team page on IBL Website

International Basketball League teams
Basketball teams in Washington (state)
Basketball teams established in 2008
2008 establishments in Washington (state)
2014 disestablishments in Washington (state)
Basketball teams disestablished in 2014
Tumwater, Washington